Detlev is a German given name. It is a spelling variant of Detlef.

People with this name 
Notable people with this name include:

Detlev Blanke (born 1941), interlinguistics lecturer at Humboldt University of Berlin
Detlev Bronk (1897–1975), President of Johns Hopkins University in Baltimore, Maryland
Detlev Buchholz, theoretical physicist at Göttingen University
Detlev Buck (born 1962), German film director and actor
Otto Detlev Creutzfeldt (born 1927), German physiologist and neurologist
Detlev Dammeier (born 1968), German football coach and a former player
Wilhelm Heinrich Detlev Körner (1878–1938), illustrator of the American West
Detlev Lauscher (1952–2010), German footballer who played as a striker
Detlev von Liliencron (1844–1909), German lyric poet and novelist from Kiel
Detlev Mehlis (born 1949), Senior Public Prosecutor in the Office of the Attorney General in Berlin
Detlev F. Neufert, German author, filmmaker and current president of the German Thai Media Association
Detlev Peukert (1950–1990), German historian
Detlev Ploog (1920–2005), German clinical psychiatrist, primate behavior researcher and anthropologist
Christian Detlev Reventlow (1671–1738), Danish diplomat and military leader
Detlev Karsten Rohwedder (1932–1991), German manager and politician (Social Democratic Party)

German masculine given names
de:Detlev
fr:Detlev